Chinese spirit possession is a practice performed by specialists called jitong (a type of shaman) in Chinese folk religion involving the channeling of Chinese deities who are invited to take control of the specialist's body, resulting in noticeable changes in body functions and behaviour. The most famous Chinese spirit possession practitioners took part in the Boxer Rebellion in the 1900s, when boxers claimed to be invulnerable to the cut of a sharp knife, bullets, and cannon fire.

History
The State of Qi had shamans who claimed to be possessed by gods, and they were criticized as heterodox by Confucians. Movements by shamans practicing spiritual possession often led peasant rebellions against the ruling dynasty during Chinese history. The Boxer Rebellion was one of many peasant movements led by shamans who claimed to be possessed by spirits. For the Boxers during the Boxer Rebellion, spirit possession was used for protective purposes.

Larry Clinton Thompson, in his book  "William Scott Ament and the Boxer Rebellion: Heroism, Hubris and the ”Ideal Missionary”, has a description of the spirit possession practiced by Chinese boxers:

Spiritual possession practitioners during the Boxer Rebellion and 20th century warfare claimed that once these incantations were chanted, Chinese deities would descend to offer protection, so that cannon fire or gunshots would not harm the human body.

See also
 Chinese spiritual world concepts
 Fuji (planchette writing)
 Tangki
 Wu (shaman)

References

Paranormal
Chinese mythology
Spirit possession